"It's Five O'clock" is a song by the Greek band Aphrodite's Child from their 1969 studio album It's Five O'Clock. It was also released as a single, in February 1970, on Mercury Records.

The song was written by Evangelos Papathanassiou and Richard Julian Francis. The song reached no. 6 in Switzerland and no. 11 in the Netherlands. Italian singer Milva in 1981 released a German-language version titled "Kennst du das auch?" and a French-language version titled "Le drapeau de l'humanité".

A new studio version by ex-Aphrodite's Child vocalist Demis Roussos was included on his 1987 album The Demis Roussos Story on the label . The recording was also released as a single from that album (in 1987 on BR Music).

Track listings 

7-inch single Mercury 6033 001 (1969, Greece)
7-inch single Mercury 132 508 MCF (1970, Germany, Netherlands, France, Belgium)
7-inch single Polydor 56791 (1970, UK)
7-inch single Mercury 132 508 MCY (1970, Italy)
7-inch single Mercury 51 32 508 (1970, Spain)
7-inch single RTB S 53592 MER (1972, Yugoslavia)
 A. "It's Five O'Clock" (3:28)
 B. "Funky Mary" (4:11)
 		 	 
7-inch EP Mercury 26 017 MCE (1970, Portugal)
 "It's Five O'Clock" (3:20)
 "Good Time So Fine" (2:44)
 "Take Your Time" (2:30)
 "Annabella" (3:20)
 		 	 
7-inch single Philips 6060 320 (1982, Belgium)
 A. "It's Five O'Clock" (3:29)
 B. "I Want to Live" (3:51)

Charts

See also 
 List of number-one hits of 1970 (Italy)
 List of number-one singles of 1970 (France)

References

External links 

 Aphrodite's Child — "It's Five O'clock" (1970 single) at Discogs
 Demis Roussos – "It's Five O'clock" (1987 single) at Discogs

1969 songs
1970 singles
1987 singles
Aphrodite's Child songs
Demis Roussos songs
Mercury Records singles
Philips Records singles
Songs with music by Vangelis